Green Park Boutique Hotel, also known as Lao Green Park Boutique Hotel and Resort, is a hotel located at 248 Khouvieng Road, Ban. Nongchanch, Vientiane, Laos. The hotel fuses traditional Lao architecture with the modern. The rooms have traditional wooden floors with Lao silks draped over chic teakwood furniture. The pool is surrounded by palm trees with fountains.

References

External links
Official site

Hotels in Vientiane
Hotel buildings completed in 2004
Hotels established in 2004
Laotian companies established in 2004